The Eccellenza ("excellence") is the fifth level (since 2014–15) of Italian football. It is a regional league, composed of 28 divisions divided geographically. All 20 regions are represented by at least one division except for Piedmont and Aosta Valley which share 2 divisions. Veneto, Tuscany, Sicily, Emilia-Romagna and Campania also have 2 divisions each, while the regions of Lombardy and Lazio have 3 divisions.

Promotion and relegation
After the regular season is completed, the first-placed team for each division is automatically promoted to Serie D.

Each division also admits one other team to participate in national playoffs that take place in late May and early June. Some divisions select the second-placed team directly, while other divisions schedule a series of divisional playoff games among the top teams in that division in order to determine the national playoff participant. Once the 28 national playoff participants are finalized, they are paired in a double-leg series, and the 14 winners participate in a second round double-leg series. The 7 winners of the second round are promoted to Serie D as well. One more place to Serie D is allowed to the winner of the "Coppa Italia Dilettanti" (Amateur Italian Cup), a year-long competition between all the national teams of both Eccellenza and Promozione (the lower division). In all, 36 teams are promoted to replace the 36 teams relegated down from Serie D.
 28 division winners
 7 national playoff winners
 1 Coppa Italiana Dilettanti winner

The relegation rules are decided regionally, but there are usually three teams relegated from each division.

Eccellenza by region
 Eccellenza Abruzzo - 1 Division
 Eccellenza Apulia - 1 Division
 Eccellenza Basilicata - 1 Division
 Eccellenza Calabria - 1 Division
 Eccellenza Campania - 2 Divisions
 Eccellenza Emilia-Romagna - 2 Divisions
 Eccellenza Friuli-Venezia Giulia - 1 Division
 Eccellenza Lazio - 3 Divisions
 Eccellenza Liguria - 1 Division
 Eccellenza Lombardy - 3 Divisions
 Eccellenza Marche - 1 Division
 Eccellenza Molise - 1 Division
 Eccellenza Piedmont-Aosta Valley - 2 Divisions
 Eccellenza Sardinia - 1 Division
 Eccellenza Sicily - 2 Divisions
 Eccellenza Tuscany - 2 Divisions
 Eccellenza Trentino-Alto Adige/Südtirol - 1 Division
 Eccellenza Umbria - 1 Division
 Eccellenza Veneto - 2 Divisions

See also
 Italian football league system

References

External links
 Official website of LND (Italian National Amateur League) 

 
1991 establishments in Italy
Italy
6
Sports leagues established in 1991
Association football clubs established in 1991
Football clubs in Italy